Chen Changxing or Ch'en Chang-hsing (1771–1853) was a 14th generation descendant and 6th generation master of the Chen Family and was an influential martial artist and teacher of taijiquan (t'ai chi ch'uan).

Chen Changxing is a slightly mysterious character and much controversy surrounds him. He is most known as the teacher of the great taijiquan master Yang Luchan, but there is much disagreement over which style of martial art Chen Changxing actually taught to the family outsider.

Some schools of thought suggest that Chen Changxing was a maverick who practiced and taught a style of martial art that was not part of the Chen Family martial arts tradition, and that was passed to him either directly or indirectly from a taijiquan master known as Jiang Fa. Some other schools of thought suggest that Chen Changxing re-worked two or more of the traditional Chen Family routines into his own style and then taught it to Yang Luchan and others. Both schools successfully explain why the taijiquan that Yang Luchan's descendants now practice is substantially different from the modern Chen routines, but neither theory can be completely substantiated and thus much controversy remains. At the same time, the members of the Chen clan believe that not much changed in Chen Taijiquan from the times preceding Chen Changxing, nor after him besides, perhaps, the sequence of the movements and their grouping in to the forms. The differences between Chen Taijiquan and other big styles are mostly attributed to the independent development of non-Chen styles in the modern and pre-modern eras. The visual representation of the Sun style, for instance, looks strikingly different from the Yang style, which in its turn mirrors the Chen style to a high degree, both in the appearance and movements names.

Chen Changxing is said to have been of an irreverent character and was given the nickname "Mr Ancestral Tablet" due to the directness of his posture. In "The Genealogy of the Chen Family" he is noted as a martial arts instructor, but the detail of the style he taught is not present.

T'ai chi ch'uan lineage tree with Chen-style focus

External links
 Chenstyle.com
 Chen Changxing Restoration Project

1771 births
1853 deaths
Chinese tai chi practitioners
People from Jiaozuo
Sportspeople from Henan